Oľšavka may refer to several places in Slovakia.

Oľšavka, Spišská Nová Ves District
Oľšavka, Stropkov District